"First Date" is the fourteenth episode of seventh and final season of the television show Buffy the Vampire Slayer.

Plot
Giles leads Buffy and the Potential Slayers in a nighttime cemetery tour where he tells how he survived the Bringer attack several weeks before by immediately overpowering and decapitating the Bringer; only to suddenly get attacked himself by Spike, who is surprised that Giles is corporeal and not the First Evil. When Giles is confused at how Spike can no longer feel pain, Buffy admits that she had the chip removed from Spike's head, much to Giles' consternation. The next morning, Giles questions Buffy on her decision, and expresses his worries that Buffy's connection to Spike, platonic or physical, may be clouding her judgement.

At work, Buffy tries to hunt for clues in Principal Wood's office as to whether he is good or evil. When she is about to open a cabinet, Wood finds her in his office and asks her out to dinner. After Buffy leaves, Wood opens the case, displaying a large collection of blade weapons, into which he places a bloody dagger. Back at the house, Buffy expresses mixed feelings about the date, and is unsure over whether she is interested in him. Willow suggests that it would be good for Buffy to move on. Xander enters and reveals that he too has a date that evening, with a young woman he met at a hardware store. Upstairs, Buffy is getting dressed for dinner when Spike appears in the hallway, and tells Buffy that he is fine with her having a date with another man, although Buffy can tell he is jealous.

On Buffy's date with Wood, they are jumped by a group of vampires. Buffy slays most of them, and thinks that Wood has set her up until she sees him take out two of the vampires. At the restaurant, Wood reveals that he is a "freelance" demon hunter, and tells her about his mother — a Vampire Slayer who was killed when he was four years old, after which he was raised by her Watcher. Meanwhile, Xander's date appears to be going well until he learns that she is a demon who is, like other demons, motivated to work for the First.

In the house, the First appears to Andrew in the guise of Jonathan, and attempts to get him to kill the Potentials by trapping them in the basement, using the gun that Willow brought to the house while she was possessed by Warren. Though Andrew says he is committed to helping Buffy and her friends, he reluctantly retrieves the gun for the First and asks why not convince Spike to kill the Potentials; to which the First replies it is not time to use Spike yet for its purposes, hinting that he will be used in the future. When Andrew asks the First questions about its intents and potential weaknesses, the First realises that Andrew is wearing a wire that Willow has set up and that she, Dawn, Amanda and Kennedy are listening to their conversation through Willow's headphones. Angered, the First appears to the girls in the guise of a horribly maimed Jonathan, threatening them before disappearing.

Soon afterwards, Willow receives a text message with a help code from Xander. Spike goes to fetch Buffy, finds her with Wood at the restaurant in a slightly romantic moment, and they all rush out to rescue Xander, driving in Wood's car. When they get to the seal beneath the school, they fight and kill the demon woman and find Xander not too badly hurt. They prevent the seal from opening again, but during the course of the fight, Wood finds out that Spike is a vampire whom Buffy cares about deeply, making him uneasy.

Back at the house, Spike tells Buffy that as the First has plans for him that could endanger others, he will leave town to prevent this. Buffy tells Spike not to leave because she is not ready for him not to be there. In Wood's apartment, the First appears to Wood in the guise of his dead mother and, though it does not say so explicitly, leads him to conclude that it was Spike who killed her in 1977.

References

External links

 

Buffy the Vampire Slayer (season 7) episodes
2003 American television episodes
Television episodes written by Jane Espenson